Wainoni is one of the eastern suburbs of Christchurch. It is a lower socio-economic area.

Etymology
Wainoni is a Māori word, with wai meaning stream and noni meaning a bend or turn. The name was applied by Alexander William Bickerton to his new home on the Avon River.

History

In 1884, Bickerton and his family moved into a new home near New Brighton, Christchurch that he named Wainoni. Bickerton, who purchased a  property around what is now Bickerton Street, was one of the three foundation professors of Canterbury College. It became a centre for the social life of students at the Canterbury College. The property included a small theatre, a vast garden, and fireworks displays for entertainment. Bickerton's idea for the property was to create a new form of society based around his socialist beliefs, however this social experiment was discontinued after several years. From 1903 the property was turned more into a theme park to provide family income, with a zoo, 7,000 person amphitheatre, conservatory, aquariums, cinema, medicine and fireworks factories, and mock naval battles on a man-made lake. It attracted hundreds of thousands of people over the coming years. In the end the Pleasure Gardens, as they were called, started running at a loss and was closed by 1914.

The suburb developed for housing during the 1960s.

Geography
Porritt Park, an old loop of the Avon River, lies within Wainoni. Going clockwise from there, boundary roads of the suburb are Wainoni, Breezes, Pages, and Kerrs Roads. Wainoni Park is located in the adjacent suburb of Aranui. 

Wainoni and its neighbouring suburb of Aranui are often considered together and intermixed. For example, Wainoni School and Wainoni Park are located in Aranui, and Aranui High School is located in Wainoni. Christchurch City Council publishes a combined community profile for the two suburbs.

Demographics

Wainoni had a population of 2,799 at the 2018 New Zealand census, an increase of 105 people (3.9%) since the 2013 census, and a decrease of 60 people (-2.1%) since the 2006 census. There were 1,029 households. There were 1,410 males and 1,386 females, giving a sex ratio of 1.02 males per female. The median age was 36 years (compared with 37.4 years nationally), with 552 people (19.7%) aged under 15 years, 591 (21.1%) aged 15 to 29, 1,305 (46.6%) aged 30 to 64, and 351 (12.5%) aged 65 or older.

Ethnicities were 78.6% European/Pākehā, 19.8% Māori, 9.5% Pacific peoples, 7.8% Asian, and 2.1% other ethnicities (totals add to more than 100% since people could identify with multiple ethnicities).

The proportion of people born overseas was 16.2%, compared with 27.1% nationally.

Although some people objected to giving their religion, 53.1% had no religion, 33.1% were Christian, 1.3% were Hindu, 0.8% were Muslim, 0.4% were Buddhist and 4.2% had other religions.

Of those at least 15 years old, 213 (9.5%) people had a bachelor or higher degree, and 585 (26.0%) people had no formal qualifications. The median income was $27,600, compared with $31,800 nationally. The employment status of those at least 15 was that 1,092 (48.6%) people were employed full-time, 345 (15.4%) were part-time, and 105 (4.7%) were unemployed.

Education
Haeata Community Campus is a coeducational composite school for years 1 to 13 with a roll of  students as of  It was created by merging Aranui School (primary school located in Aranui), Avondale School (primary school located in the neighbouring Avondale), Wainoni School (primary school in Aranui) and Aranui High School on the Aranui High site in January 2017.

References

Suburbs of Christchurch